Matteo Brancaleoni (born 31 May 1981 in Milan, Italy) is an Italian contemporary pop/jazz singer, actor and journalist.

Biography 
Appreciated by Michael Bublè with whom he duetted live in Rome in 2007 during Bublè’s concert, Matteo Brancaleoni is an Italian jazz singer and interpreter of the Great American Songbook. He was voted among the ten best jazz singers by Italian readers of Jazzit magazine. He has collaborated  Franco Cerri, Renato Sellani, Gianni Basso, and Fabrizio Bosso. The magazine Jazz Hot compared him to his idol, Frank Sinatra. In 2008 he wasa named Best New Talent at the Elba Jazz Festival. His debut album Just Smile and his second album Live in Studio were well received by audiences and critics nationally and internationally. Live in studio was for two weeks the best selling jazz album on iTunes and for six months his live performances were listed in the live recommended section by the Apple Store.

New Life was conceived from an encounter with Roman writer and arranger Nerio Poggi (aka Papik), a writing partner with Mario Biondi in his last two albums. A journalist, member of IJJA (International Jazz Journalist Association), the International Federation of Journalists, he wrote for Jazz Magazine and Millionaire.

Discography 
Studio albums
 Just Smile (Philology) - (2006)
 Live in studio (MBrec) - (2009)
 New Life (Irma Records/LaDouche) - (2012)

Independent albums
 Merry Merry Christmas (D'Herin Records) - (2008)

Live albums
 Live! with Gianpaolo Petrini Big Band (D'Herin Records) - (2012)

Compilation
 2006 Un Sanremese a Londra - (CSK Multimedia)
 2007 Il Meglio di Zazzarazzaz (various artists) - (CSK Multimedia)
 2007 Jazz Magazine (n.49) - (Emme K Editore, New Sounds2000)

Guest appearances
 2007 Time After Time, Still In My Heart, (Michela Lombardi, Renato Sellani) - (Philology)
 2007 For All We Know, Moonlight Becomes You, (Michela Lombardi, Renato Sellani) - (Philology)
 2009 Pure Imagination, Enter Eyes, (Andrea Celeste, Andrea Pozza) - (Zerodieci/Incipit Records)

DVDs
 The Gianpaolo Petrini Big Band - Live from Collegno (Electromantic music) - (2010)
 Live! with Gianpaolo Petrini Big Band'' (D'Herin Records) - (2012)

See also 

 List of crooners
 List of Italian actors
 List of Italian journalists
 List of jazz fusion musicians
 List of smooth jazz performers
 Music of Milan

References

External links 
 Official site

1981 births
20th-century Italian male actors
20th-century Italian male singers
20th-century Italian male writers
21st-century Italian male actors
21st-century Italian male singers
21st-century Italian male writers
Crooners
Italian jazz singers
Italian journalists
Italian male journalists
Italian male television actors
Italian pop singers
Italian male singer-songwriters
Jazz-pop singers
Living people
Singers from Milan
Smooth jazz singers
Male jazz musicians